Hayman drums was an English musical instruments manufacturer established in 1968. The idea was to come up with a drum kit series to compete with the success of the large American companies of the time.

The shells were thin walled with rings, and painted white with what they called "Vibrasonic" interiors. The lugs were essentially a copy of the Camco designs. Hayman was out of business by 1975. The company started with the name George Hayman on the badge, then shortened it to just "Hayman" in later years.

History 
They were the brainchild of Ivor Arbiter who was the first to import Ludwig and Gretsch drums during the "beat boom". It was he who, in the sixties, cleverly identified a gap in the market for a loud drum set at a time when drummers were seldom miked-up outside of the studio. The original plan was to affix metal liners inside the shells of rather ordinary beech Carlton drums and, indeed, some of these were actually made. Ultimately they discarded the metal inserts, which were weighty and expensive and instead chose to thickly coat the drums' interior surfaces.

Originally the drums were named "George Hayman" after one of the guys in Dallas-Arbiter's Shoeburyness factory (whose surname, to confuse things further, was actually Haymon) and, possibly, George Way who made the legendary Camcos. In further homage to that famous American marque, the set's lugs were also made circular, which was well avant-garde at the time. Anyway, the name was eventually shortened to the more identifiable "Hayman".

The drums had a mixture of features which, prior to 1969, would only be seen on expensive American products. Triple-flange hoops, which gave a more open sound, very new to British drums, as were non-telescopic spurs, adjustable, swivelling shell mounts and cymbal arms and an abundance of tension screws and Remo heads.

Dallas-Arbiter designed their own cumbersome tom holder too, which might well have looked good on the drawing board, but in reality was something of a nightmare. A flat, curved and slotted rail was jacked up a little above the bass drum shell and to this was attached the body of the cast tom holder itself. This was fitted with not one, but two ratchets and by judicious use of both you could actually have exceedingly limited horizontal height adjustment. A radial-toothed block was fixed to the tom which mated with a ratchet on the holder to maintain its playing angle, and very large capstan nuts locked tom to holder and holder to bass drum rail. These capstans had an annoying tendency to crush your fingers against the drum and were neither particularly stable nor hard wearing. But at the time, it was the best around. Hayman spurs were modelled on Ludwig type outrigger designs, but with large, cast circular holder blocks which matched the nut boxes and also located the tom legs. Hayman's 'lightning-bolt' bass drum tensioners were the first that were ergonomically designed to ease operation – they were shaped to accommodate the thumbs better.

The Dallas-Arbiter company also produced pretty good double-braced, tripod-based stands and pedals called Speedamatic, which were actually a lot more substantial and sophisticated than the majority of their competition. They're no doubt still seeing service in drum sets almost a quarter of a century after their conception. The snare stand was the first in Britain to use a basket-holding mechanism while the wide, industrial-fibre-belted bass pedal and double-sprung hi-hat (both featuring easily adjustable springs) were particularly were worthy. They were more rugged than just about anything else on the market, although the extremely chunky, scalloped cast screws which arrested all the adjustable bits did leave something to be desired.

Initially the Hayman snare drums all had 5½" deep wooden shells in common with the rest of the drums, but a year or so later aluminium-shelled versions were introduced. They were loosely modelled along the lines of Ludwig's 400, although in appearance, their shells were much more like Gretsch's. I'm told they didn't make too many metal drums so they’re evidently quite collectable.

After the "Beverley Cosmic 21", Hayman were amongst the first non-American snare drums to have ten tensioners per head and boasted a simple, but effective American-style on/off strainer attached to a 22 strand snare too. Unlike the"21", they also had an American-style swivelling damper like Ludwig's.

Dating Hayman Drums 

 If the badge and/or snare strainer says "George Hayman", then it is from 1968–69.
 If the badge is a 4 cm brass one with "Hayman  – then it is around 1969–73
 If the badge is smaller and silver then it is one of the last to be made during 74/75.

Also, each round badge on a Hayman drum has a patent number – giving the year of manufacture within the patent number.

See also 
List of drum makers

References

External links

Percussion instrument manufacturing companies
Musical instrument manufacturing companies of the United Kingdom